25-hydroxycholesterol 7alpha-hydroxylase (25-hydroxycholesterol 7alpha-monooxygenase, CYP7B1, CYP7B1 oxysterol 7alpha-hydroxylase) is an enzyme with systematic name cholest-5-ene-3beta,25-diol,NADPH:oxygen oxidoreductase (7alpha-hydroxylating). This enzyme catalyses the following chemical reaction

 (1) cholest-5-ene-3beta,25-diol + NADPH + H+ + O2  cholest-5-ene-3beta,7alpha,25-triol + NADP+ + H2O
 (2) cholest-5-ene-3beta,27-diol + NADPH + H+ + O2  cholest-5-ene-3beta,7alpha,27-triol + NADP+ + H2O

25-hydroxycholesterol 7α-hydroxylase is a heme-thiolate protein (P-450).

References

External links 
 

EC 1.14.13